The Blackburn F.2 Lincock was a British single-seat lightweight fighter produced by Blackburn Aircraft Limited.

Design and development
In 1928 Blackburn designed and built a private venture lightweight biplane fighter powered by an Armstrong Siddeley Lynx IVC engine. The Blackburn F.2 Lincock was of wooden construction and first appeared in May 1928. It performed well in demonstrations but failed to gain any orders. The Canadian government showed an interest in the design, and a metal construction variant (the Lincock II) was built. It was tested in Canada at Camp Borden in 1930 where there was interest in using the Lincock as an advanced trainer, but the type was not ordered. It was later used to perform public aerobatic displays in 1933 and 1934.

The final version was the Lincock III of which five were produced, two were delivered to China, two to Japan and one retained as a demonstrator. Interest from Italy resulted in Piaggio acquiring a licence to produce a two-seat version as an aerobatic trainer, though only one Piaggio P.11 was built.

Variants
Lincock IWooden-construction prototype, one built.
Lincock IIMetal-construction prototype, one built.
Lincock IIIProduction version, five built.
Piaggio P.11two-seat aerobatic trainer, one built in Italy.

Operators

Chinese Nationalist Air Force received two aircraft.

Imperial Japanese Army Air Force received two aircraft.

Specifications (Lincock III)

References

 

1920s British fighter aircraft
Lincock
Single-engined tractor aircraft
Biplanes
Aircraft first flown in 1928